Ben Lomond, formerly Ben Lomond Mountain, elevation , is a mountain in the North Shore Mountains of southwestern British Columbia, Canada.  It is located southeast of the town of Squamish and immediately west of Loch Lomond and was named in association with that lake, both mountain and lake being named in reference to the mountain and lake of that name in Scotland.

Climbing history
The first recorded ascent of Ben Lomond was in 1908 by F. Perry and W. J. Gray.

Climate

Based on the Köppen climate classification, Ben Lomond is located in the marine west coast climate zone of western North America. Most weather fronts originate in the Pacific Ocean, and travel east toward the Coast Mountains where they are forced upward by the range (Orographic lift), causing them to drop their moisture in the form of rain or snowfall. As a result, the Coast Mountains experience high precipitation, especially during the winter months in the form of snowfall.

See also
Ben Lomond 
Ben Lomond (disambiguation)

References

One-thousanders of British Columbia
North Shore Mountains